As of June 2022, Czech Airlines served only a limited number of destinations in Europe. The CSA website offers possibility to book additional destinations as codeshare flights with Smartwings.

List

References

External links
Czech Airlines route map

Czech Airlines
Lists of airline destinations
SkyTeam destinations